Andrea Bajani (born August 16, 1975) is an Italian novelist, poet, and journalist.
After his debut with Cordiali saluti (Einaudi, 2005), it was Se consideri le colpe (Einaudi, 2007) which brought him a great deal of attention. Antonio Tabucchi wrote about his debut novel, "I read this book with an excitement that Italian literature hasn't made me feel in ages." The book won the Super Mondello Prize, the Brancati Prize, the Recanati Prize and the Lo Straniero Prize.

After three years, with his novel Ogni promessa (Einaudi, 2010; published in English as Every Promise by MacLehose Press), he won the oldest Italian literary award, the Bagutta Prize. His collection of short stories, La vita non è in ordine alfabetico (Einaudi, 2014) won the Settembrini Prize in 2014. His most recent novel is Un bene al mondo (Einaudi 2016), and is currently being made into a film. In 2013 he published Mi riconosci, a homage to the famous Italian writer Antonio Tabucchi.

In 2017 Einaudi published his first book of poems, Promemoria. The second one, Dimora naturale, was published in 2020.
He is also an author of journalistic essays and regularly contributes to the daily newspaper La Repubblica.

Bajani taught Creative Writing at the Scuola Holden in Turin, and has been Chief Editor for Italian fiction at Bollati Boringhieri publishing house since 2017.  A book of literary criticism analyzing his work, written by Sara Sicuro and entitled Andrea Bajani. Una geografia del buio, was published in 2019.

Novels

Bajani's best-known novel, Se consideri le colpe (Einaudi, 2007), won the Mondello Prize, the Recanati Prize, and the Brancati Prize. It will be published in English as If you Kept a Record of Sins by Archipelago in 2020. Set between Italy and the booming industrial landscape of a Romania teeming with Italian businessmen, it follows the story of Lorenzo, a son striving to come to terms with the memory of his estranged mother. Emmanuel Carrère described the novel as "at once masterful and very touching."

Ogni Promessa (Einaudi, 2010; published in English as Every Promise) is half a love-story, half an exploration of memory and its power.  From Sara and Pietro's struggle to conceive a child, to the ghosts of World War II, to Italy's military attempts in Russia, the story moves between time and place, creating a vivid tangle of intersecting hopes, desires, and memories.  Antonio Tabucchi described the novel as “A unique book that within the space of a novel produces a sort of concentrated comédie humaine, which upon reading expands and deflates, creating a narrative universe in development...a very special story whose themes recall the great classics.”  De Telegraaf wrote of the book: “Andrea Bajani’s phrases are meandering and beautiful […]. Moving, poetic, exuberant."

La vita non è in ordine alfabetico (Einaudi, 2014) is a compilation of short stories in the vein of Italo Calvino, two for each letter of the alphabet.  The style moves between poetry and prose, with seemingly unconnected stories linked together.  An article in la Repubblica wrote of the book, "Bajani shows us that words can be knives, stones, soap bubbles, medicinal leaves, love potions or instruments of torture. Words are not just means of communication. They embody life, desire, the flesh. We don’t simply use words, we are made of them; we live and breathe through words."  The Dutch novelist and poet, Cees Nooteboom, wrote "this book has touched a nerve."

Un bene al mondo (Einaudi, 2016) is the tale of a boy and his pain.  Between fairy-tale and magic realism, the book does not fall neatly in generic literary categories.  Michael Cunningham described it thus: "Bajani is a true original.  His prose is possessed of the simple, cadenced rhythm I associate with fairy tales, as is a certain, subtle sense of the fantastic in his imagery, though the story he’s telling is very much for adults, and takes place in an all-too-real world. Bajani’s work is suffused with a certain innocence that not only belies but intensifies the pain and anomie of which he writes...There's love, there's wonder, as well.  There is, in short, much of what makes life worth writing about."

Il libro delle case (Feltrinelli, 2021) tells the story of a man called Io through the houses the he lived in. The story spans the life of Io from birth in 1975 to 2020 through short chapters, not in chronological order, describing the places where Io or other characters in the story have lived. The novel explores life, friendship, love and emotional struggles of Io through the rooms that witnessed them. The personal story of Io is weaved together with two momentous events: the kidnapping and subsequent killing of the prime minister Aldo Moro in 1978, and the discovery of the body of well-know writer and film-maker Pier Paolo Pasolini, killed in 1975.   

Cordiali saluti (Yours Sincerely)(Einaudi, 2005)
Mi spezzo ma non m'impiego (I break, but I don't bend)(Einaudi, 2006)
Se consideri le colpe (If you Kept a Record of Sins)(Einaudi, 2007)
Domani niente scuola (No School Tomorrow)(Einaudi, 2008)
Ogni Promessa (Every Promise)(Einaudi, 2010)
Mi riconosci (You Know Me) (Feltrinelli, 2013)
La vita non è in ordine alfabetico (Life is not in Alphabetical Order) (Einaudi, 2014)
Un bene al mondo (One Good Thing in the World) (Einaudi, 2016)
Il libro delle case (The Book of Houses) (Feltrinelli, 2021)

Poetry

Promemoria (Reminders) (Einaudi, 2017)

Editions in other languages 
Très cordialement trad. Vincent Raynaud (Éditions du Panama, 2005) 
Si tu retiens les fautes trad. Vincent Raynaud (Editions Gallimard, 2009) 
Toutes les familles trad. Vincent Raynaud (Editions Gallimard, 2013) 
Mit herzlichen Grüßen (Mit einem Nachwort von Ascanio Celestini) (Deutscher Taschenbuch Verlag, 2010) 
Lorenzos Reise (dtv premium), 
Liebe und andere Versprechen (dtv premium), 
Liebe und andere Versprechen (dtv eBook), 
Every Promise trad. Alistair McEwen (MacLehose Press, Jun 2013) 
De belofte Dutch Trad.Yond Boeke, Patty Krone (Athenaeum-Polak & Van Gennep) 
Wie houdt dan stand? Dutch Trad. Yond Boeke, Patty Krone (Athenaeum-Polak & Van Gennep, 2010) ISBN 9 789025367015

Stories in collections 
Paolino e la vita di città in Opere d'inchiostro (Rubettino,1999) 
Vicini in Lettere in-chiostro (Marcovaldo ; Addictions, 1999) 
Il cielo dell'Africa è più grande che qui in Questa è l'Africa (Edizioni dell'Arco, 2004) 
Storia di un altro impiegato in Deandreide (BUR, 2006) 
All inclusive in Laboriosi oroscopi (Ediesse, 2006) 
La data scritta in fondo in 1987/2007 I venti racconti + uno (Edizione speciale per Marie Claire, 2007)
Forse si muore così in Mordi&Fuggi (Manni, 2007) 
Grattacapo voce in Dizionario affettivo della lingua italiana (Fandango, 2008) 
Non ci sono più le Vespe di una volta in ho visto cose (BUR, 2008) 
Il quarto strato in Le nuove ricette del cuore (Blu Edizioni, 2008) 
Andirivieni in Pene d'amore (Guanda, 2008) 
La morte di Babbo Natale in Natale sotto la Mole (interlinea, 2008) 
Tanto si doveva in Lavoro da morire. Racconti di un'Italia sfruttata, di AA.VV. (Einaudi, 2009) 
A scuola sotto le macerie in Consiglio di classe (Ediesse, 2009)

Reportage 
Mi spezzo ma non m'impiego (Einaudi, 2006) 
Domani niente scuola (Einaudi, 2008)

Other 
Scrivere non è importante, ma non si può fare altro in Il valore letterario nel romanzo del Novecento europeo – i quaderni del Baretti (Gribaudo, 2000) 
Il grande spot in Scrivere sul fronte occidentale (Feltrinelli, 2002) 
Un tempo era il lavoro in Italia. Immagini e storia1945-2005 – 3. Il lavoro (volume supplement in the Unit)
Parole a maglia in Annali 2007/III - Fondazione europea del disegno (Fondation Adami) (Bruno Mondadori, Ricerca, 2007) 
Prefazione a Venaria città reale by Ornella Orlandini (EGA Editore, Collana Immagini, 2008) 
chi non muore si rivede racconto per il Natale 2008 by In Adv, Media By Design, Ineditha, Dgt Media. Volume stampato in trecento copie numerate.
Tutti i bambini del mondo in la figlia di Isacco by Valerio Berruti (Damiano Editore, 2009) 
Postfazione a Dal Comunismo al Consumismo by Mihai Butcovan - Marco Belli (La Carmelina Edizioni-Linea BN),

Translations 
sono un assassino (Je suis un assassin, Éditions du Rocher, 2002) by Laurent Graeve (Instar Libri, 2003) 
Clima di paura (Climate of Fear, Profil Books Ltd., 2004) by Wole Soyinka ( with Mariapaola Pierini) (Codice edizioni, 2005) 
Il piccolo principe (Le petit prince) (Einaudi, 2014)

Theatre 
Acqua-Storie da un pianeta assetato, with Mariapaola Pierini, Produced Onda Teatro, 2003
Miserabili - Io e Margareth Thatcher, with Marco Paolini-Lorenzo Monguzzi-Michela Signori, produzione Michela Signori per JOLEFILM, 2007 (the show is also distributed on DVD and music on CD)
"18.000 giorni" Il pitone, Produced Fuorivia and Teatro Stabile di Torino, 2010

References

External links
Andrea Bajani: professional writer videos, reviews, interviews and more (continually updated) (available in English using Google translate)
Andrea Bajani: Current news, Books, Interview, Review Site by Andrea Bajani in German (available in English using Google translate)
Screw project Weekly column by Andrea Bajani held on Torinosette of La Stampa, here you can read the articles (available in English using Google translate).
Andrea Bajani on Giulio Einaudi editore web page 
Prisoner in Facebook [PDF] by the Italian newspaper Il Sole 24 Ore 
 Andrea Bajani at the Berlin International Literature Festival 2014
Andrea Bajani Internationales Künstlerhaus Villa Concordia in Bamberg

1975 births
Living people
Writers from Rome
Italian journalists
Italian male journalists
Italian male writers